John Walmsley (14 October 1867, in Hereford – 9 December 1922, in Freetown) was an English Anglican missionary bishop for the Anglican Diocese of Sierra Leone in the early twentieth century.

Walmsley was educated at Brasenose College, Oxford. and ordained in 1890. After a curacy at Stokenham he was Principal of Wycliffe Hall, Oxford from 1894 to 1898. He held incumbencies at  St Giles, Normanton-by-Derby and St Ann, Nottingham.

Walmsley served as Bishop of Sierra Leone from 1910 until his death.

References

1867 births
1922 deaths
Alumni of Brasenose College, Oxford
People from Hereford
Anglican missionaries in Sierra Leone
Sierra Leonean educators
Anglican bishops of Sierra Leone
People associated with Durham University
English Anglican missionaries
Missionary educators
20th-century Anglican bishops in Sierra Leone